Luboš Hilgert may refer to:

 Luboš Hilgert (canoeist, born 1960), husband of Štěpánka Hilgertová
 Luboš Hilgert (canoeist, born 1986), son of Štěpánka Hilgertová